The Reich Commissioner for the Consolidation of German Nationhood was an office in Nazi Germany, which was held by Reichsführer-SS Heinrich Himmler.

Adolf Hitler in his 7 October 1939 order Erlaß des Führers und Reichskanzlers zur Festigung deutschen Volkstums appointed Himmler to carry out the following duties:
Overseeing of the final return to the Reich of the Volksdeutsche and Auslandsdeutsche (Reichsdeutsche who live abroad)
Prevention of "harmful influence" of populations alien to the German Volkstum
Creation of new populated areas settled by Germans, mostly by the returning ones.

The commissioner was therefore responsible for the return, repatriation, and settlement of ethnic Germans who lived abroad, into Nazi Germany and German held territories.

See also
Generalplan Ost
Lebensraum

References

Government of Nazi Germany
Allgemeine SS